Eulimella paucisulcata is a species of sea snail, a marine gastropod mollusk in the family Pyramidellidae, the pyrams and their allies.

Description
The helicocone  shell can be distinguished from the shell of Eulimella angeli by a clear protoconch - teleoconch boundary. Furthermore, the growth lines are straight and orthocline (at right angles to the growth direction of the helicocone).

Distribution
This species occurs in the Atlantic Ocean off Mauritania and Ghana at a depth of 0 m.

References

External links
 To World Register of Marine Species

paucisulcata
Gastropods described in 1997